Dul Taher (also Romanized as Dūl Ţāher) is a village in Jastun Shah Rural District, Hati District, Lali County, Khuzestan Province, Iran. At the 2006 census, its population was 98, in 24 families.

References 

Populated places in Lali County